McKilligan is a surname. Notable people with the surname include:

Betty McKilligan (born 1949), Canadian pair skater
John McKilligan (born 1948), Canadian pair skater

See also
McGilligan